UFC 107: Penn vs. Sanchez  was a mixed martial arts event held by the Ultimate Fighting Championship (UFC) on December 12, 2009 in Memphis, Tennessee at the FedExForum.

Background
On October 21, it was announced that a previous matchup between welterweight contenders Thiago Alves and Paulo Thiago had been changed to Alves vs. Jon Fitch because Fitch's opponent for UFC 106, Ricardo Almeida, suffered an injury. Paulo Thiago fought on UFC 106 on November 21 against UFC newcomer Jacob Volkmann and won the fight by unanimous decision.

It was then announced on October 30 that Fitch would again be without an opponent as Alves was forced to withdraw because of a posterior cruciate ligament tear. It was later announced that Jon Fitch would face Mike Pierce at UFC 107.

Paul Buentello was scheduled to face Todd Duffee on the card, but an injury forced Duffee to pull out.  Buentello faced Stefan Struve on the card.

A middleweight bout between Alan Belcher and Wilson Gouveia was changed to a 195-pound catchweight bout after Gouveia asked for a 190-pound catchweight limit, but Belcher gave a counter-offer of 195 pounds.

Another matchup scheduled for this card was a match-up between The Ultimate Fighter: Heavyweights coaches Rashad Evans and Quinton Jackson but the bout was cancelled after Jackson was selected for the role of Cpl. B. A. Baracus in The A-Team film. The fight would later happen at UFC 114.

Results

Bonus awards
Fighters were awarded $65,000 bonuses.

Fight of the Night: Alan Belcher vs. Wilson Gouveia
Knockout of the Night: T. J. Grant
Submission of the Night: DaMarques Johnson

See also
 Ultimate Fighting Championship
 List of UFC champions
 List of UFC events
 2009 in UFC

References

Ultimate Fighting Championship events
2009 in mixed martial arts
Events in Memphis, Tennessee
Mixed martial arts in Tennessee
Sports in Memphis, Tennessee
2009 in sports in Tennessee